The 2021 Women's Rugby League World Cup Final was the rugby league match to determine the winner of the 2021 Women's Rugby League World Cup, played between the two finalists on 19 November 2022 at Old Trafford in Manchester, England.

Background

Venue

Old Trafford hosted the Women's World Cup final for the first time. The ground has hosted the men's final twice in 2000, 2013, and hosted the 2021 Men's Final aswell. It was confirmed as the venue to host the final on 10 June 2020, when the fixture for the event was released.

The ground is often used for major rugby league matches, being the primary venue for the annual Super League Grand Final, which is the championship-deciding game of Britain's Super League competition, and top-tier test matches such as the Kangaroo tour and the now-defunct Four Nations.

The ground is the home stadium of English football team Manchester United, and has a capacity of 74,310, which makes it the largest club football stadium (second-largest football stadium overall after Wembley Stadium, and third largest on total with the rugby union Twickenham Stadium coming in second) in the United Kingdom, and the eleventh-largest in Europe.

Route to the final

Australia
Group Stage
 Cook Islands: 74–0
 France: 92–0
 New Zealand: 10–8
Semi Final
 Papua New Guinea: 82–0

New Zealand
Group Stage
 France: 46–0
 Cook Islands: 34–4
 Australia: 8–10
Semi Final
 England: 20–6

Match

Post match

Men's final

The women's final was played as a double header men's final for the first time in the tournament's history.

See also
2021 Wheelchair Rugby League World Cup Final

Notes

References

World
Women's Rugby League World Cup
World
Rugby league in England
Rugby league matches